Dixie, also known as New Dixie, is a historic sternwheeler located on Webster Lake at North Webster, Kosciusko County, Indiana.  She was built in 1928–1929, and is a steel-hulled, diesel-electric powered passenger ship.  She was modified substantially in 1950.

It was added to the National Register of Historic Places in 2009.

See also
National Register of Historic Places listings in Kosciusko County, Indiana
Moro Bay ferry: Arkansas ship also made by the Barbour Metal Boat Works

References

Ships on the National Register of Historic Places in Indiana
1929 ships
Buildings and structures in Kosciusko County, Indiana
National Register of Historic Places in Kosciusko County, Indiana
Ships built in St. Louis
Transportation in Kosciusko County, Indiana
Paddle steamers of the United States